The 2016–17 Cool & Cool Present Jazz National T20 Cup was a Twenty20 domestic cricket competition held in Multan, Pakistan. It took place from 25 August to 16 September 2016, with eight teams competing instead of 18 in previous years. It was the thirteenth season of the National Twenty20 Cup in Pakistan.

Karachi Blues won the tournament, beating Karachi Whites by 3 runs in the final. However, they were not invited to defend their title the following year.

Squads
The following players were selected:

Points table

 Team qualified for the Semi-finals

Fixtures

Round-robin

Knockout stage

Semi-finals

Final

References

External links
 Series home at ESPN Cricinfo

Pakistani cricket seasons from 2000–01
Domestic cricket competitions in 2016–17
2016 in Pakistani cricket
2016–17 National T20 Cup